The fat spring minnow ('Pseudophoxinus crassus'') is a species of cyprinid fish.
It is found only in Turkey.
Its natural habitats are rivers and intermittent rivers.
It is threatened by habitat loss.

References

Pseudophoxinus
Endemic fauna of Turkey
Fish described in 1960
Taxonomy articles created by Polbot